Warm Mineral Springs is a census-designated place (CDP) in Sarasota County, Florida, United States. The population was 5,061 at the 2010 census. It is part of the Bradenton–Sarasota–Venice Metropolitan Statistical Area.

The Warm Mineral Springs locale is notable for a free-flowing artesian spring. A large portion of the area was annexed by the municipality of North Port, and is now part of that city. The Warm Mineral Springs Motel designed by modernist architect Victor Lundy, one of the architects associated with the Sarasota School of Architecture, is listed on the National Register of Historic Places.

Geography
Warm Mineral Springs is located at  (27.047440, -82.268902).

Demographics

As of the census of 2000, there were 4,811 people, 2,720 households, and 1,765 families residing in the CDP. The racial makeup of the CDP was 98.90% White, 0.33% African American, 0.06% Native American, 0.21% Asian, 0.06% from other races, and 0.44% from two or more races. Hispanic or Latino of any race were 0.81% of the population.

There were 2,720 households, out of which 2.1% had children under the age of 18 living with them, 61.6% were married couples living together, 2.2% had a female householder with no husband present, and 35.1% were non-families. 31.2% of all households were made up of individuals, and 26.5% had someone living alone who was 65 years of age or older.  The average household size was 1.77 and the average family size was 2.10.

In the CDP, the population was spread out, with 2.5% under the age of 18, 1.1% from 18 to 24, 4.7% from 25 to 44, 19.3% from 45 to 64, and 72.4% who were 65 years of age or older.  The median age was 72 years. For every 100 females, there were 83.9 males.  For every 100 females age 18 and over, there were 83.6 males.

The median income for a household in the CDP was $30,806, and the median income for a family was $37,488. Males had a median income of $30,847 versus $16,921 for females. The per capita income for the CDP was $23,213.  About 4.7% of families and 7.6% of the population were below the poverty line, including 34.6% of those under age 18 and 5.2% of those age 65 or over.

In 2010 Warm Mineral Springs had a population of 5,061.  The racial composition of the population was 96.5% white, 1.5% black, 0.2% Native American, 0.3% Asian, 0.02% Native Hawaiian or other Pacific islander, 0.5% some other race, and 1.0% two or more races. Hispanic or Latino of any race were 3.3% of the population.

References

External links

Census-designated places in Sarasota County, Florida
Census-designated places in Florida